Henryk Janduda (11 February 1924 – 28 November 2008) was a Polish footballer and manager.

He played in nine matches for the Poland national football team from 1948 to 1950. As a player he amassed multiple seasons in the top division with AKS Chorzów. He later became a player-manager and then manager.

References

Bibliography
Andrzej Gowarzewski: Biało-czerwoni. Dzieje reprezentacji Polski 1947–1970. GiA Katowice, 1995. ISBN 83-902751-4-7.
Andrzej Gowarzewski: Mistrzostwa Polski. Ludzie (1945-1962). 100 lat prawdziwej historii. GiA Katowice, 2017. ISBN 978-83-88232-63-3.
Andrzej Gowarzewski: Mistrzostwa Polski. Mecze – Kluby – Sezony (1945-1955). 100 lat prawdziwej historii. GiA Katowice, 2018. ISBN 978-83-88232-64-0.

External links
 

1924 births
2008 deaths
Polish footballers
Poland international footballers
Association footballers not categorized by position